"God Bless Anguilla" is the national song of the British overseas territory of Anguilla. Adopted in 1981, shortly after the separation of Anguilla from Saint Christopher-Nevis-Anguilla, it is considered the official local anthem, as "God Save the King" remains the official national anthem.

Lyrics

References

British anthems
National symbols of Anguilla
National anthems